The Deutsche Shanghai Zeitung (DSZ), later Der Ostasiatische Lloyd, was a German language newspaper published in Shanghai, China. That publication was associated with the Nazi Party.

History
The newspaper was established on 27 September 1932.<ref>Taaks, p. 239. "Die Deutsche Shanghai Zeitung (DSZ) erschien vom 27. September 1932 bis 31 Dezember 1935 mit sechs[...]"</ref> The paper was owned and edited by Max Simon-Eberhard, a former army captain. Hartmut Walravens, author of "German Influence on the Press in China," said that the newspaper did not do well initially but after Paul Huldermann, a professional journalist, took control, the performance improved. The newspaper was renamed and reorganized in January 1936 so it could benefit from the reputation of the previous Ostasiatischer Lloyd.

See also

 Shen Bao Shanghai Jewish Chronicle North China Daily News Shanghai Evening Post and Mercury Tsingtauer Neueste NachrichtenReferences
 Taaks, Christian. Federführung für die Nation ohne Vorbehalt?: deutsche Medien in China während der Zeit des Nationalsozialismus. (Volume 20 of Beiträge zur Kommunikationsgeschichte Geschichte) Franz Steiner Verlag Wiesbaden GmbH, 2009. , 9783515087391.
 Walravens, Hartmut. "German Influence on the Press in China." - In: Newspapers in International Librarianship: Papers Presented by the Newspaper Section at IFLA General Conferences. Walter de Gruyter, January 1, 2003. , 9783110962796.
Also available at (Archive) the website of the Queens Library - This version does not include the footnotes visible in the Walter de Gruyter version
Also available in Walravens, Hartmut and Edmund King. Newspapers in international librarianship: papers presented by the newspapers section at IFLA General Conferences. K.G. Saur, 2003. , 9783598218378.

Notes

Further reading
 Kreissler, François. L'Action culturelle allemande en Chine: de la fin du XIXe siècle à la Seconde guerre mondiale. Les Editions de la MSH (FR), 1989. , 9782735102778. - "Deutsche Shanghai Zeitung" mentioned in pages 98, 102, 103, and 105

External links
 Der Ostasiatischer Lloyd National Library of Australia''. Description based on: Vol. 2, no. 162 (June 17, 1940). Libraries Australia ID 25884752.

German-language newspapers published in China
Defunct newspapers published in China
Newspapers published in Shanghai
Publications established in 1932
1932 establishments in China